Salomies is a surname. Notable people with the surname include:

Ilmari Salomies (1893–1973), Finnish archbishop
Martti Salomies (1922/23–1987), Finnish diplomat and ambassador, son of Ilmari